Nathan Shaw (born September 22, 1991), better known by his stage name Ekali, is a Canadian electronic music producer who is originally from Vancouver, British Columbia. He has played at festivals and events such as Coachella, The Grass Is Greener, and Shambala Festival.

Discography

2017 
 "Babylon (featuring Denzel Curry)"
 "Akira (with Krane)"
 "Past Life" (featuring Opia)"

2018 
 "Blood Moon (with Tynan and Hekler)"

2022 
 "Remember Me (with RemK)"

References 

Living people
1991 births
Trap musicians (EDM)
Owsla artists
Monstercat artists
Electronic dance music DJs
Canadian DJs
Musicians from Vancouver